Toshiba Pasopia 7 (also known as PA7007) is a computer from manufacturer Toshiba, released in 1983 and only available in Japan. It was intended as the successor of the Toshiba Pasopia, offering improved sound and graphics. Graphic memory is increased to 48 KB and two SN76489 sound chips are available, producing six five-octave channels and two noise channels. 

The machine is partially compatible with the original Pasopia, and supports connecting cartridge-type peripherals.

A new version of the operating system, T-BASIC7, is also available. 
This version is based on Microsoft BASIC and adds specific commands for this model, such as higher numerical precision or support for extra colors.

Available peripherals for this model are a 5" disk drive, a Chinese characters ROM, a RS-232 interface and a printer. The keyboard is a full-stroke keyboard, JIS standard with a separated numeric keypad and some function keys.

Released in 1985, the Pasopia 700 is based on the Pasopia 7, and was intended as a home learning system developed by Toshiba and Obunsha. Two disk-drives were added to the side of the main unit and the keyboard is separate. This machine has two cartridge slots (one at the front).

After 1988, some Pasopia 7 computers were donated to developing countries under the "International Development of Computer Education Program".

Color palette 
The Pasopia 7 uses hardware dithering to simulate intermediate color intensities, based on a mix of two of eight base colors. This allows the machine to display a maximum of 27 colors (3-level RGB).

The 8 base colors are displayed in bold.

Actual color limits depend on the graphic mode used:

 Text mode: characters in 8 base colors, graphics in 4 colors (from 27);
 Fine graphics mode: kanji characters in 8 base colors, graphics in 8 colors (from 27);
 Palette function: 8 or 4 colors (from 27) depending on the overlap of kanjis and graphics;
 Hardware tiling function: 27 colors can be displayed by combining 2 pixels, with 8 base colors available per pixel.

See also 
 Toshiba Pasopia 
 Toshiba Pasopia 5
 Toshiba Pasopia IQ
 Toshiba Pasopia 16

References 

Pasopia
Z80-based home computers
Computer-related introductions in 1983